Kenchanagudda  is a village in the southern state of Karnataka, India. The village is located in the Siruguppa taluk of Ballari district.

Tourism
River Tungabhadra flows through this village, branching into seven streams.  There are also seven kattes (platforms constructed of stones around a wide tree where a group of people sit for a chit-chat). The place is surrounded by more than a dozen hills.

On the bank of the river there is the vrindavana (holy grave of Hindu saints, especially of those belonging to a matha or parampara(lineage)) of Sri Vasudhendra teertha who is the great grandson of Sri Raghavendra Swami.  The Raghavendra mutt of Mantralayam administers the vrindavana. This place attracts Brahmin tourists from all over Karnataka.  Every year, on the sixth, seventh and eighth days ( namely shashthi, saptami and ashtami) of the ashvayuja mãsa of the Hindu calendar, the aãradhane (anniversary of the day on which the saint entered the vrindavana alive) of Sri Vasudhendra teertha swamy is held in kenchanagudda.

The river here is known for its scenery. A song of the Kannada film Maanasa Sarovara titled Chanda Chanda was shot here.  Remains of the era of Vijayanagara Empire are found around the village.

There is a hydro-electric power plant across one of the seven branches of the river.

How to reach

Kenchanagudda is located 5 km west of Siruguppa. There are two routes to kenchanagudda. When coming from Ballari along NH-150A, take a left besides a petrol bunk, just before entering Siruguppa. The road, headed towards Kampli reaches the kenchanagudda village after 4 km. From the village, a small road tangential off the right of the main road leads to the vrindavana. To reach kenchanagudda from inside the Siruguppa town, follow the road leading to CNN school.

See also
 Bellary
 Districts of Karnataka
 Siruguppa
 River Tungabhadra
 Sri Raghavendra Swami

References

Sri Vasudendra Tirtharu @ Kenchanagudda, Bellary District

External links
 http://Bellary.nic.in/

Villages in Bellary district